Our Man in Hollywood is a 1963 album by American composer and arranger Henry Mancini.

Reception

Greg Adams reviewed the album for AllMusic and wrote that "All of the selections were newly recorded for the album, and many display Mancini's skill as a composer as well as arranger and conductor".

The initial Billboard review from January 5, 1963 commented that the tracks featured the "highly stylised Mancini treatment" and noted the "wall to wall violins" and "driving percussion" of the "top-notch Hollywood instrumentalists".

Track listing
 "The Days of Wine and Roses" (Henry Mancini, Johnny Mercer) – 2:05
 "Walk on the Wild Side" (Elmer Bernstein, Mack David) – 3:27
 "The Theme from "The Wonderful World of the Brothers Grimm" (Bob Merrill) – 1:52
 "Love Song from "Mutiny on the Bounty" (Bronislaw Kaper, Paul Francis Webster) – 2:44
 "Mr. Hobbs Theme" (Mancini) – 1:54
 "Seventy-Six Trombones" (Meredith Willson) – 2:33
 "Love Theme from Phaedra" (Mikis Theodorakis) – 2:38
 "Bachelor in Paradise" (Mancini, David) – 2:28
 "Too Little Time" (from The Glenn Miller Story) (Don Raye, Mancini) – 3:48
 "Drink More Milk" (from Boccaccio '70) (Nino Rota) – 2:05
 "The Wishing Star" (from Taras Bulba) (Franz Waxman, David) – 2:55
 "Dreamsville" (Ray Evans, Jay Livingston, Henry Mancini) – 3:12

Personnel
Henry Mancini – arranger, conductor
Vincent DeRosa – French horn (solo on "Days of Wine and Roses")
Plas Johnson – tenor saxophone (solo on "Walk on the Wild Side")
Dick Nash – trombone (solo on "Too Little Time")
Ted Nash – soprano saxophone (solo on "Love Theme from Phaedra")
Ronnie Lang – piccolos
Laurindo Almeida – guitar
Shelly Manne – percussion
Bob Bain – guitar
Jimmy Rowles – piano
Unidentified chorus
Production
Al Schmitt – engineer
Dick Peirce, Steve Sholes – producer

References

External links
 

1963 albums
Albums arranged by Henry Mancini
Henry Mancini albums
albums produced by Steve Sholes
RCA Victor albums